Wesley Koolhof and Nikola Mektić defeated Jürgen Melzer and Édouard Roger-Vasselin in the final, 6–2, 3–6, [10–5] to win the doubles tennis title at the 2020 ATP Finals. It was their first ATP Tour title together.

Pierre-Hugues Herbert and Nicolas Mahut were the reigning champions, but did not qualify this year.

Mate Pavić and Bruno Soares clinched the year-end world No. 1 doubles team ranking after Rajeev Ram and Joe Salisbury lost to Melzer and Roger-Vasselin in the semifinals.

Seeds

Alternates

Draw

Finals

Group Bob Bryan

Group Mike Bryan
Standings are determined by: 1. number of wins; 2. number of matches; 3. in two-players-ties, head-to-head records; 4. in three-players-ties, percentage of sets won, then percentage of games won, then head-to-head records; 5. ATP rankings.

References

External links 
Official Website
Draw

Doubles